Kurada is situated in East Godavari district in Karapa, in Andhra Pradesh State.

References

Villages in Krishna district